HELP University (formerly known as HELP Institute, and subsequently as HELP University College) is a private university in Kuala Lumpur, Malaysia. It was founded in 1986 by its President and Vice-Chancellor, Datuk Dr Paul Chan Tuck Hoong, and Group CEO Datin Chan-Low Kam Yoke. HELP Institute was awarded the University College status in 2004 by the Ministry of Higher Education, Malaysia and was awarded full university status in 2011. HELP is an acronym for Higher Education Learning Philosophy. HELP first offered the University of London External Programmes and the twinning programmes with the University of Glamorgan, Wales, United Kingdom, and the University of Southern Queensland, Australia. It has partnerships with universities in the United Kingdom, Australia, New Zealand, the United States, Canada, Indonesia, Vietnam, China, and in Europe. HELP University is a member of the HELP Education Group. The HELP Education Group consists of HELP University, HELP Academy, HELP International School, Crescendo-HELP International School, and Tunku Putra-HELP International School.

Campuses 

HELP University has two campuses. One located in Damansara Heights, Kuala Lumpur, and the other in Subang Bestari, Shah Alam, Selangor.

HELP University's Subang 2 campus opened its doors in April 2016 and is the larger campus of the two. The campus won the IFLA Asia Pacific Awards 2019, Honorable Mention;  and the Malaysia Landscape Architecture Awards MLAA 2018, Honour, Landscape Design Award Professional Category. Both awards were won by Verona Landscape Architecture that designed the Subang 2 landscape.

The Subang 2 campus which was designed by GDP Architect, also won the PAM Awards 2017, Education (Commendation).

Faculties and Centres 
HELP University has 6 academic faculties, a Graduate School, a Centre for Continuing Professional Development, and an Institute for Crime and Criminology.

Faculties

 Faculty of Behavioural Sciences, Education, and Languages
 Faculty of Economics, Business, and Accounting
 Faculty of University Foundation Studies
 Faculty of Law and Government
 Faculty of Computing and Digital Technology
 Faculty of Arts and Communication
Centres

On 24 November 2022, HELP University established and opened the first Centre for Neuropsychology in Malaysia.

HELP Academy

HELP Academy houses the following departments:

 Department of A-Levels The Department of A-Levels offers the Pearson Edexcel A-Levels, and the Cambridge A-Levels.
 Department of Management.  The Department of Management offers twinning programmes from the University of Derby, United Kingdom.

Notable alumni

Media & Entertainment
 Che Puan Sarimah Ibrahim (Psychology Graduate) – TV Host, Radio Announcer, Former Actress & Singer.
 Lisa Surihani (Law Graduate) – Model, Actress & TV Host.
 Jane Teoh, Model, Miss Universe Malaysia 2018
 Shwetajeet Kaur Sekhon – Model, Actress & Miss Universe Malaysia 2019.

Sports

 Sara Yap Kim Wen (Psychology Graduate) – Taekwondo.

Awards

Premier Digital Tech University (PDTU Status) 
The university was awarded the Premier Digital Tech University (PDTU) status in 2019 by the Malaysian Digital Economy Corporation (MDEC), a recognition given to Malaysia's leading digital tech focused tertiary institutions.

QS Rating and Ranking 
HELP University was the first university in Southeast Asia to be awarded 5 stars in 8 categories by Quacquarelli Symonds (QS) Star Rating System  in April 2020. The 8 categories are Teaching, Internationalisation, Employability, Academic Development, Facilities, Social Responsibility, Inclusiveness, and Programme Strength for its Masters in Business Administration (MBA).

HELP University was ranked No1 among 650 universities in Asia for Outbound Student Exchange Programme by QS Rankings: Asia 2021.

The university was rated between 401 and 450 in the Asian University Rankings 2021 by QS Rankings.

Relationship with Kim Jong-Un 
In 2013, HELP University awarded North Korean leader Kim Jong-Un with an honorary doctorate. This move generated negative press at the time, but the president of the university stating that he hopes such a 'soft constructive' approach would help improve things in North Korea.

References

External links
 

Universities and colleges in Kuala Lumpur
Educational institutions established in 1986
1986 establishments in Malaysia
Private universities and colleges in Malaysia